The Saudi Center for International Communication (CIC) is a Saudi Arabian government media organization established in August 2017 by the Minister of Culture and Information (MOCI).

The Saudi Gazette described the CIC's purpose at its launch as "boosting relations with the international media and following a more open policy towards the international audience". The establishment of the CIC is part of the Vision 2030 project spearheaded by Saudi Crown Prince Mohammed bin Salman.

Activities

Promotion of Saudi Arabia 

The Center acts as a central source of information about Saudi Arabia to the outside world. This information includes a governmental statistics bureau that publishes data, infographics, videographics and documents. The center responds to media inquiries on fields such as politics, tourism, gender equality, human rights and local investment opportunities in both English and Arabic.

International outreach 
CIC aims to help the international press in understanding local news, cultural, social and political trends in Saudi Arabia and by broadcasting information and reports about events involving the Kingdom. The Center also aims to support the Ministry's stated aim of reforming its media industries at home, supporting government communications abroad and strengthening Saudi Arabia's cultural relations around the world.

Events 
CIC works in concord with other entities in the Saudi Minister of Culture and Information (MOCI) to produce events in Saudi Arabia to promote Saudi, Arabic and Islamic culture.

References 

Government agencies of Saudi Arabia
Mass media in Saudi Arabia